Somberek is a village in Baranya county, Hungary. Residents are Hungarians, with a minority of Germans and their descendants.

External links 
 Street map 

Populated places in Baranya County
Serb communities in Hungary